Rifat Odeh Kassis is a Palestinian Christian who was born in Beit Sahour, in the West Bank. An active human rights and political and community activist. He is an author and speaker. He has been arrested and imprisoned several times by Israel.

In 1991 he founded the Palestinian section of the international child rights organization, Defence for Children International (DCI) and in 2005 he was elected President of the international movement. In October 2008, during the International General Assembly meeting, held in Brussels, he was re-elected President for another term. In October 2008, he became the General Director for DCI-Palestine section and in 2013, he was appointed by the DCI International Executive Council as the General Commissioner for the Middle East and North Africa.

End 2014, he concluded his work as General Director of Defense for Children International Palestine and moved temporarily to Jordan to lead the Lutheran World Federation program there. End June 2015, he started together with other international consultants a consulting group called GRIP.Consulting www.grip.consulting

Career
In 1995 he helped to establish a rehabilitation program in Chechnya targeting Chechen children who have been injured and traumatized in the war. In 1995, he co-founded the Alternative Tourism Group (ATG), a Palestinian NGO specializing in tours and pilgrimages.

In 1996 he left Palestine to work in Central Asia for several years, helping to develop the NGO sector there.

In September 2000, he came back to Palestine to become the Executive Director of the East Jerusalem YMCA. As a response to the second Intifada he founded the "Keep Hope Alive Campaign" and founded and run the YMCA/YWCA Joint Advocacy Desk.

In 2003, he co-founded the Occupied Palestine and Syrian Golan Heights Advocacy Initiative (OPGAI), a network works on contributing to establishing a social movement and advocating on ending the Israeli occupation of Palestine and the Syrian Golan Heights.

In 2004, he co-founded the Palestinian National Coalition of Christian Organizations in Palestine (PNCCO), a network from several Christian related organizations works on enhancing the unity between these groups and giving a national voice to the Palestinian Christians in their struggle on ending the Israeli occupation to their land.

In 2005 he joined the World Council of Churches (WCC) in Geneva to run the Ecumenical Accompaniment Programme in Palestine and Israel (EAPPI).
From September 2007 till October 2008 he was appointed as the Special Adviser to the General Secretary of the World Council of Churches on the Middle East. From September 2007 to October 2008 he was a Consultant at Dar Annadwa, the International Center of Bethlehem (ICB).

He was a member of ICCO International Advisory Group, the Netherlands from 2002 till 2009. He was also a member of the Advisory Group of Dan Church Aid- Denmark from 2000 till 2008. ICCO and Dan Church Aid are European global donor agencies.

In January 2008, he became a Member of the Board of Directors of Alternative Information Center, (AIC). In March 2008 together with others, he established "Badayl/Alternatives" an international consulting agency. In April 2008, he was asked to join Peace for Life (PfL) as a member of its working group, in Manila, the Philippines. PfL is an international faith-based coalition fighting injustice in many countries in the World. In June 2008 he was selected as a member of the World Economic Forum’s Global Agenda Council on the Welfare of Children, Switzerland.

He is a co-author and the general coordinator of Kairos Palestine which is the Christian Palestinians’ word to the world about what is happening in Palestine.

Published works
He is the author of several articles, study papers and researches. He spoke in many national and international conferences.

In 2006, he published his first book, Palestine: A Bleeding Wound in the World’s Conscience.

In 2011, he published his second book, "Kairos for Palestine".

He contributed to several other published books among them:

In English
 From Communal Strife to Global Struggle- Justice for the Palestinian People. Published by AIC in 2004
 Bapylon will fall: Empire and Kingdom of God-Challenges to Christian Mission. Issued by seminaro Evangelico Teolgia, Matanzas, Cuba in 2006
 Christian Community, facts, figures, and trends. 2008, published together with Mitri Raheb, Rania Alqas and Rifat Kassis.
 A History of Child Rights in Action. Published by DCI, Geneva in 2009
 United in Struggle against Israeli Colonalization, Occupation, and Racism. Published by AIC in 2009
 Kairos for Global Justice forwarded by Patrirach Michel Sabah. Published by Kairos Palestine in 2012
 Colonial Democracy. Published by AIC in 2012
 Generation Palestine- Voices from the Boycott, Divestement and Sanctions Movement. Edited by Rich Wiles and forwarded by Archbishop Desmond Tutu. Published by Pluto Press London in 2013
 Theology of Tourism Published by the Senate of Serampore university in India in 2013

In Arabic
 Arab Spring and Christians of the Orient. Published by DIYAR in 2012

In Dutch 
 Liber Amicorum- Kinderrechten Beginnen Thuis. Published by DCI/Netherlands in 2007

In Danish
 Kirker I Mellemosten-Arbog 2003-2004. Published by Det Mellemkirkelige Rad, Copenhaven in 2004

See also
Kairos Palestine
Palestinian Christians

References 

 Rifat Odeh Kassis in COSMOS

External links
Sa'adat kidnap boosts Olmert's election campaign,  The Electronic Intifada, 17 March 2006 
Fatah Chapter Closed: Creating a Palestinian National Congress The Electronic Intifada, 28 March 2006 
When will Israel learn?(1/2) Live from Palestine, 28 June 2006 
When will Israel learn? (2/2) Live from Palestine, 14 July 2006 

Living people
Palestinian activists
Palestinian Christians
People from Beit Sahour
Year of birth missing (living people)
YMCA leaders